Irving Domingo Lorenzo Jr. (born June 26, 1970), professionally known as Irv Gotti, is an American DJ, music producer, record executive, and the CEO and co-founder of Murder Inc. Records. He is best known for producing multiple number-one records for Ashanti, Ja Rule, and Jennifer Lopez, as well as his collaborations with Jay-Z, DMX, and Kanye West. Gotti is also the creator of the BET series Tales.

Early life/Single Life 
Irv Gotti was born in the Hollis neighborhood of the borough of Queens in New York City.  Irv married Debbie Lorenzo. They got divorced after a 
decade of marriage in 2013. Debbie and Irv welcomed three children: Angie, Sonny, and Jonathan Wilson "JJ".

Career 
After helping Def Jam with the success of DMX and Jay-Z, Russell Simmons gave Irv Gotti his own label under Def Jam. While watching Biography on A&E during gangster week, a Murder, Inc. logo appeared on the screen and Irv Gotti decided to use the name for his label because Murder, Inc. put out hits for murder and Irv wanted to put out hit records.

Irv, Ja Rule and the label of Murder Inc. were all involved in a well-publicized feud with G-Unit Records, Aftermath Records and Shady Records over history between 50 Cent and Ja Rule. After this Murder Inc. would change their name to The Inc. 

Under The Inc. banner, Irv would move the label to Universal Motown and sign Vanessa Carlton. Gotti co-produced Vanessa Carlton's third album, Heroes and Thieves, which was released October 9, 2007, with Channel 7, Rick Rubin and Stephan Jenkins.

In an interview with Angie Martinez in early May 2009, Gotti stated that his label, Murder Inc., was leaving Universal Records.

In September 2013, Murder Inc. was relaunched as an umbrella label under Irv Gotti's new label, Visionary.

Legal Issues
On Friday, January 3, 2003, federal agents and New York Police Department investigators raided the headquarters of Murder Inc. Records, located at One Worldwide Plaza in Midtown Manhattan. The raid was a part of a yearlong investigation into the connection between The Lorenzo brothers and American drug lord Kenneth “Supreme” McGriff. Investigators believed that the Lorenzos launched Murder Inc. Records using money bankrolled by McGriff to launder McGriff’s drug money, as well as help McGriff launder drug money through the making of the 2003 film Crime Partners. Although computers and documents were seized, no charges were immediately filed, and no arrests were immediately made. The raid was dramatized in the music video for Ja Rule’s Murder Reigns.

Chris and Irv Gotti’s history with McGriff dates back to 1994, when McGriff, newly paroled from prison, met Chris and Irv on the set of a music video in Queens, New York. McGriff wanted to go into cinematography and sought help from Chris and Irv Gotti to produce and direct a film based on Donald Goines’ Kenyatta series’ novel Crime Partners. The Lorenzos since then maintained a friendship with McGriff, having him appear in the music video for Ja Rule’s 1999 single “Murda 4 Life” and helped financed McGriff’s dream project, Crime Partners, around 2000.

On January 25, 2005, Chris and Irv Gotti surrendered to authorities in New York City and were officially charged with money laundering and conspiracy to launder money. During the trial, Irv Gotti was represented by Gerald B. Lefcourt, and Chris Gotti was represented by Gerald Shargel. In December 2005, Chris and Irv Gotti were found not guilty of money laundering and conspiracy to launder money.

Discography

Singles produced 

 1994
 "Shit's Real" (Mic Geronimo)
 1996
 "Can I Live" (Jay-Z)
 1998
 "Can I Get A..." (Jay-Z featuring Amil & Ja Rule)
 "Hot Spot" (Foxy Brown)
 1999
 "What's My Name" (DMX)
 "Holla Holla" (Ja Rule)
 2000
 "Come Back in One Piece"  (Aaliyah & DMX) 
 "Between Me and You" (Ja Rule featuring Christina Milian)
 2001
 "What's Luv?" (Fat Joe featuring Ashanti & Ja Rule)
 "I'm Real (Murder Remix)" (Jennifer Lopez featuring Ja Rule)
 "Ain't It Funny (Murder Remix)" (Jennifer Lopez featuring Ja Rule & Caddillac Tah)
 "I Cry" (Ja Rule)
 "Always on Time" (Ja Rule featuring Ashanti)
 2002
 "Foolish" (Ashanti)
 "Happy" (Ashanti)
 "Down 4 U" (Irv Gotti featuring Ja Rule, Ashanti, Vita & Charli Baltimore)
 "Mesmerize" (Ja Rule featuring Ashanti)
 "Gangsta Lovin" (Eve (rapper) featuring Alicia Keys)
 2004
 "Breakup 2 Makeup" (Ashanti featuring Black Child) 
 "Wonderful" (Ja Rule featuring Ashanti and R. Kelly)
 2005
 "Infatuated" (Memphis Bleek)
 2008
 "Nice" (The Game) featuring Newz
 2018
 "Violent Crimes" (Kanye West)
 2019
 "Brothers" (Kanye West featuring Charlie Wilson)

References

External links 

1970 births
American hip hop record producers
African-American record producers
Def Jam Recordings artists
Grammy Award winners
Living people
Murder Inc. Records artists
Businesspeople from New Rochelle, New York
East Coast hip hop musicians
American music industry executives
Musicians from Queens, New York
Record producers from New York (state)
21st-century African-American people
20th-century African-American people